1996 Italian Indoor, Boris Becker and Guy Forget were the defending champions but only Forget competed that year with Jakob Hlasek.

Forget and Hlasek lost in the final 6–4, 7–5 against Andrea Gaudenzi and Goran Ivanišević.

Seeds

  Cyril Suk /  Daniel Vacek (first round)
  Guy Forget /  Jakob Hlasek (final)
  Yevgeny Kafelnikov /  Menno Oosting (semifinals)
  Ellis Ferreira /  Jan Siemerink (first round)

Draw

References
 1996 Italian Indoor Doubles Draw

Milan Indoor
1996 ATP Tour
Milan